Trottiscliffe Meadows is a  biological Site of Special Scientific Interest south of Trottiscliffe in Kent. It is a Nature Conservation Review site, Grade I. 

These meadows on gault clay are crossed by calcareous streams, and they are two of the few remaining areas of unimproved grassland in the county. They have a number of uncommon plants, such as marsh valerian, carnation sedge, brown sedge and the rare moss cratoneuron filicinum.

The meadows are private land, but a public footpath crosses one of them.

References

Sites of Special Scientific Interest in Kent